The Gatekeeper's Daughter (French: La fille du garde-barrière) is a 1975 French comedy film directed by Jérôme Savary and starring Mona Heftre, Michel Dussarat and Annick Berger.

Main cast
 Mona Heftre as Mona 
 Michel Dussarat as Dudu 
 Annick Berger as Madame Julien 
 Jean-Paul Farré as Le maire 
 Valérie Kling as Gertrude, la femme du maire 
 Jean-Paul Muel as Sheik Abdullah 
 Roland Topor as Le pochard 
 Jérôme Savary as Le garde-barrière 
 Maritin as Chauffeur 
 Guy Gallardo as Bernard 
 Gérard Boucaron as L'eunuque 
 Pablo Vigil as Le vizir 
 Jean Abeillé as Le Président de la République

References

Bibliography 
 Rège, Philippe. Encyclopedia of French Film Directors, Volume 1. Scarecrow Press, 2009.

External links 
 

1975 films
1975 comedy films
French comedy films
1970s French-language films
1970s French films